Doten is a surname. Notable people with the surname include:

Alfred Doten (1829–1903), American journalist and diarist
 Edward Doten (c. 1599–1655), English passenger on the 1620 voyage of the Mayflower
Mark Doten, American novelist and librettist
Stuart van Doten (born 1989), Dutch former footballer